Daryl Monfils (born 1 March 1993) is a French tennis player.

Monfils made his ATP main draw debut at the 2012 Open Sud de France in the doubles draw partnering his brother Gaël Monfils in which they lost in the first round.

References

External links

1993 births
Living people
French male tennis players
Tennis players from Paris